This list includes the topographic elevations of each of the 50 U.S. states, the District of Columbia, and the U.S. territories.

The elevation of a geographic area may be stated in several ways. These include:
The maximum elevation of the area (high point);
The minimum elevation of the area (low point);
The arithmetic mean elevation of the area (statistical mean elevation);
The median elevation of the area (statistical 50% elevation); and
The elevation range of the area.

All topographic elevations are adjusted to the North American Vertical Datum of 1988 (NAVD 88). All geographic coordinates are adjusted to the World Geodetic System of 1984 (WGS 84). The mean elevation for each state, the District of Columbia, and Puerto Rico are accurate to the nearest . Mean elevation data is not available for the other U.S. territories.


Elevations

Minor outlying islands
The highest points in the U.S. minor outlying islands, mostly unnamed:
Baker Island high point – 
Howland Island high point – 
Jarvis Island high point – 
Johnston Atoll, Sand Island high point – 
Kingman Reef high point – less than 
Midway Atoll, Sand Island high point –  – The highest point of the U.S. minor outlying islands in the Pacific Ocean.
Navassa Island high point –  – The highest point of all the U.S. minor outlying islands.
Palmyra Atoll high point – 
Wake Island high point –

Gallery

See also

 Highpointing
 List of elevation extremes by country
 List of elevation extremes by region
 Lists of highest points
 List of highest U.S. county high points
 List of mountain peaks of the United States
 List of the highest major summits of the United States
 List of the most prominent summits of the United States
 List of the most isolated major summits of the United States
 List of highest counties in the United States
 List of highest United States cities by state

Notes

References

External links

National Geodetic Survey
Finding Survey Marks and Datasheets
United States Geological Survey
National Map Search
Elevation Point Query Service

 
+States
Elevation
 
Peak bagging in the United States
Lowest points